Proximic is a platform that provides real-time data services for contextual data for online advertisers and agencies. The company is based in Palo Alto, with research and development facilities in Munich. The company's CEO Philipp Pieper co-founded the company with mathematician Thomas Nitsche. Thomas Nitsche and Elmar Henne, Proximic's chief architect, developed the Mephisto Chess Computer. Chief Scientist was Louis Monier, cofounder of the AltaVista search engine.

Proximic launched in alpha testing mode in late 2007. In 2010, the company integrated with the real-time ad platform AppNexus and started to offer its contextual data services to the display advertisers and agencies.

In May 2015, Proximic was acquired by Comscore.

References

External links
Official Website

Digital marketing companies of the United States
Internet properties established in 2007
Internet search engines
Web crawlers
Online advertising
Online advertising services and affiliate networks